Kara-Bulak is a village in Batken Region of Kyrgyzstan. It is part of the Leylek District. Its population was 2,852 in 2021.

References

Populated places in Batken Region